Martin Olive (born 18 April 1958) played first-class and List A cricket for Somerset from 1977 to 1981. He also played Minor Counties and List A cricket for Devon. He was born at Watford, Hertfordshire.

Olive was a right-handed middle-order or opening batsman. He was a successful school cricketer at Millfield School and was playing for Somerset's second eleven at the age of 17. In 1977, he made a single List A appearance and then his first-class debut, playing in a handful of games, and then appeared in the England Under-19 team in one-day international matches. The strength of Somerset's squad restricted Olive's first-team opportunities to a single game in each of the 1978 and 1979 seasons; he did not play any further one-day matches for Somerset. But in 1980, he played in nine first-class games, and in the match against Yorkshire at Weston-super-Mare he made exactly 50, the only first-class half-century of his career. Wisden Cricketers' Almanack, in its report on Somerset in the 1981 edition, said that Olive "did enough to suggest a future as a sound opening batsman".

In 1981, however, Olive was unsuccessful in the three first-class matches in which he appeared, and Jeremy Lloyds became the regular opening batsman for the team. Olive left the Somerset staff at the end of the season and took a job in a building society in Devon: the building society was the target of a holdup on his first day. In 1982, 1986 and 1987, he played Minor Counties cricket for Devon and in 1987 he made a single List A appearance in the NatWest Trophy, opening the batting for Devon in a heavy defeat against Worcestershire.

As of 2011, he is head of key accounts at Sun Life Financial of Canada, based in Bristol.

References

1958 births
Living people
English cricketers
Somerset cricketers
Devon cricketers
People educated at Millfield